Henry Badham Thornhill  was an Anglican priest, most notably the first Archdeacon of Perth, WA. 
 
On his return from Australia he served at Eatington, and Henley in Arden. He died on 2 March 1874.

References

19th-century Australian Anglican priests
Archdeacons of Perth, WA
1874 deaths